1700 Market is a high-rise building located in the Market West region of Philadelphia, Pennsylvania. It is currently tied with Two Logan Square as the 20th-tallest building in Philadelphia. The architect of the building was Murphy Levy Wurman. 1700 Market has the distinction of being the tallest building in Philadelphia built during the 1960s.

1700 Market is a 32-story, Class A trophy office building totaling 841,172 square feet located in the heart of Center City, Philadelphia. Sitting on 1.39 acres, the property also includes a five-story; seven hundred and thirty-five (735) space parking garage. The lower level contains retail services, building storage, and office areas. Positioned approximately two blocks from City Hall and two blocks from Rittenhouse Square, 1700 Market Street boasts the quintessential “main and main” location in the City of Philadelphia. Built in 1969 by Charles Luckman & Associates, the superstructure is cast-in-place, waffle-slab construction with precast concrete panels. Precast curtain wall concrete panels contain punch-outs with anodized single-glazed tinted glazing

See also

 List of tallest buildings in Philadelphia
 Buildings and architecture of Philadelphia

References

External links

 Emporis
 SkyscraperPage

Skyscraper office buildings in Philadelphia
Office buildings completed in 1968
Brutalist architecture in Pennsylvania